Law museum may refer to:

ABA Museum of Law, in Chicago, Illinois
American Museum of Tort Law, in Winsted, Connecticut
Law Uk Folk Museum in Hong Kong